Detlef is a given name of German origin. It is also spelled Detlev.

People with this name
Notable people with this name include:

Detlef Bothe (born 1957), East German sprint canoeist
Detlef Bothe (born 1965), German actor
Detlef Bruckhoff (born 1958), retired German footballer
Detlef Enge (born 1952), former East German football player
Detlef Gerstenberg (1957–1993), East German hammer thrower
Detlef Gromoll (1938–2008), German mathematician
Detlef Grumbach (born 1955), German author and journalist
Detlef Hofmann (born 1963), German sprint canoeist
Detlef Kästner (born 1958), East German boxer
Detlef Kübeck (born 1956), retired East German sprinter
Detlef Kirchhoff (born 1967), German rower
Detlef Kraus (1919–2008), German pianist
Detlef Laugwitz (1932–2000), German mathematician
Detlef Lewe (1939–2008), West German sprint canoeist
Detlef Lienau (1818–1887), German architect born in Denmark
Detlef Lohse (born 1963), German fluid mechanics researcher
Detlef Michel (born 1955), German track and field athlete
Detlef Nebbe (1912–1972), SS-Hauptscharführer and member of staff at Auschwitz concentration camp
Detleff Neumann-Neurode (1879–1945), pioneering German pediatric physical therapist
Detlef Okrent (1909–1983), German field hockey player
Detlef Pirsig (1945–2019), former German football player
Detlef Quadfasel, professor of geophysics at Niels Bohr Institute
Detlef Raugust (born 1954), German former footballer
Detlef Richter (born 1956), East German bobsledder
Detlef Sack (born 1965), professor of Comparative Political Science at Bielefeld University
Detlef Schößler (born 1962), German former footballer, now a coach
Detlef Schmidt (born 1958), West German sprint canoeist
Detlef Schrempf (born 1963), retired German NBA basketball player
Detlef Siebert, German television writer, director and producer, working in the UK
Detlef Soost (born 1970), German dancer and choreographer
Detlef Thorith (born 1942), retired East German discus thrower
Detlef Uhlemann (born 1949), former West German distance runner
Detlef Ultsch (born 1955), former East German judoka
Detlef Wagenknecht (born 1959), East German middle-distance runner
Detlef Weigel (born 1961), German American scientist working at the interface of developmental and evolutionary biology
Detlef Wiedeke (born 1950), German singer, composer and producer
Gustavus Detlef Hinrichs (1836–1923), published findings on chemical element periodicity before Dmitri Mendeleev or Lothar Meyer

German masculine given names